Anthony Wilson was a Member of Parliament of the United Kingdom for the constituency of Lincolnshire, Parts of Kesteven and Holland from 27 March 1857 to 28 April 1859.

References 

19th-century British politicians
UK MPs 1857–1859
Members of the Parliament of the United Kingdom for English constituencies
Place of death missing
Place of birth missing
Year of death missing
Year of birth missing